Piya Kay Ghar Jaana Hai is a Pakistani drama which aired in 2006 on ARY Digital & on Star Plus in India .

Cast
Karanvir Bohra as Altaf
 Cezanne Khan
 Imran Abbas Naqvi as Amaan Ali
 Achint Kaur
 Dipannita Sharma
 Aman Verma
Zainab Qayyum

Supporting Cast
Wilmer Valderrama

References
Dua #zahra #ko #Ghar #Jana #hy

Dua #zahra #ko #Ghar #Jana #hy

2006 Pakistani television series debuts
Pakistani drama television series
Urdu-language television shows
ARY Digital original programming
2006 Pakistani television series endings